John Charles Ramsden (30 April 1788 – 29 December 1836) was a British Whig politician from Newby Park in Yorkshire. He sat in the House of Commons between 1812 and 1836.

Early life
He was the eldest son of Sir John Ramsden, 4th Baronet (1755–1839), the Member of Parliament (MP) for Grampound, and his wife Hon. Louisa Susan Ingram-Shepheard (–1857), daughter of the 9th Viscount of Irvine. His younger brother, Captain Henry James Ramsden (1799–1871), is the direct ancestor the 8th and 9th Ramsden Baronets.

Career 
At the 1812 general election, Ramsden was elected as one of the two MPs for borough of Malton. He was re-elected at the next four general elections, and held the seat until 1831.
At the 1831 general election he was elected as one of the four MPs for the Yorkshire county constituency.
He was appointed as a Deputy Lieutenant of Yorkshire in May 1831, and held his seat in Parliament until the constituency was divided by the Reform Act 1832, and at the general election in December 1832 he unsuccessfully contested the new North Riding of Yorkshire constituency.

He was returned to the Commons three months later, when he was elected without a contest as MP for the Malton, at a by-election after the sitting Liberal MP Viscount Milton resigned to contest a vacancy in the Northern division of Northamptonshire. He was re-elected unopposed in 1835, and held the seat until his death.

Personal life
On 4 May 1814, he married Isabella Dundas (1790–1887), daughter of Thomas Dundas, 1st Baron Dundas of Aske and Lady Charlotte FitzWilliam. Isabella's maternal grandfather was William Fitzwilliam, 3rd Earl Fitzwilliam, and her uncle was William Fitzwilliam, 4th Earl Fitzwilliam, a leading Whig politician and one of the richest people in Britain. Together, they were the parents of:

 Sir John William Ramsden, 5th Baronet (1831–1914), who married Lady Helen Guendolen Seymour, daughter of Edward Seymour, 12th Duke of Somerset, in 1865.

He died in 1836, aged only 48. As he predeceased his father, his son John succeeded to the baronetcy on the death of his grandfather, the 4th baronet in 1839.

References

External links 
 
 

1788 births
1836 deaths
Whig (British political party) MPs for English constituencies
UK MPs 1812–1818
UK MPs 1818–1820
UK MPs 1820–1826
UK MPs 1826–1830
UK MPs 1830–1831
UK MPs 1832–1835
UK MPs 1835–1837
Deputy Lieutenants of Yorkshire
Heirs apparent who never acceded